Josef Wallnig is an Austrian conductor.  He studied piano and composition at the Hochschule für Musik und darstellende Kunst Mozarteum in Salzburg, and also studied piano, composition, and conducting at the Hochschule für Musik und darstellende Kunst, Wien.

Wallnig has conducted both operas and concerts in the United States of America, Japan, Korea, Russia, Egypt, Bulgaria, Romania, Germany, Italy, among others. He has also conducted for recordings. He was given the title of Artistic Director of the Mozart Opera Studies Institute, and became the Vice Artistic Director of the Mozart-Chor Salzburg in 1992.

Wallnig teaches at American and Japanese musical conservatories.

External links
 Current Bio at Mozarteum

Austrian classical musicians
Austrian music educators
Living people
Year of birth missing (living people)
Members of the European Academy of Sciences and Arts
21st-century conductors (music)
21st-century classical pianists